IRTS is a four-letter acronym that can have several meanings:

Indian Railway Traffic Service
Intensive Residential Treatment Services
Irish Radio Transmitters Society